Batman Forever is a pinball machine released in June 1995 by Sega Pinball. It is based on the motion picture of the same name.

Features 
The game uses the 192x64 "supersize" dot matrix display with a Motorola 68000-based 16-bit controller. It features several electric-green wireform ramps with the "Batcave" escape ramp extending down behind the flippers and over the playfield apron, releasing balls up the playfield during multi ball. The "Batwing" cannon rotates & aims across the playfield and fires the ball with a pistol grip on front of the machine. Speech clips from the film are used. Additionally, the game had a video mode in which the Batmobile is guided over rooftops, dodging obstacles to earn bonus points.

References

External links
Internet Pinball Database entry for Batman Forever

1995 pinball machines
Video games based on Batman films
Batman (1989 film series)
Pinball machines based on films
Sega pinball machines